Country Preacher is a live album recorded by the Cannonball Adderley Quintet in 1969.

Recorded at an unidentified church meeting of the Chicago chapter of the Southern Christian Leadership Conference's Operation Breadbasket, the album spent two months in the Cash Box R&B charts in 1970.

Described by discographer and Adderley biographer Chris Sheridan as "an audible sociological record", the introduction is by the Reverend Jesse Jackson. The liner notes, written by Adderley, give some background to Operation Breadbasket and the Country Preacher.

The album is the first with bassist Booker as a member of the Quintet.

Adderley, in his introduction to the title track, mentions fellow saxophonist Ben Branch, the director of the Operation Breadbasket Orchestra and Choir.

Track listing 

Introduction by the Reverend Jesse Jackson
 "Walk Tall" (Zawinul, Marrow, Rein) 5:03
 "Country Preacher" (Joe Zawinul) 4:30
 "Hummin'" (Nat Adderley) 6:32
 "Oh Babe" (Nat Adderley, Julian Adderley) 4:50
 "Afro-Spanish Omlet"a. Umbakwen (Nat Adderley) 4:30b. Soli Tomba (W. Booker) 3:03c. Oiga (Joe Zawinul) 4:23d. Marabi (Julian Adderley) 3:47
 "The Scene" (Joe Zawinul, Nat Adderley) 2:01

Personnel 
 Julian "Cannonball" Adderley - alto and soprano saxophones
 Nat Adderley - cornet and vocals on "Oh Babe"
 Joe Zawinul - keyboards
 Walter Booker - bass
 Roy McCurdy - drums

References 

1970 live albums
Cannonball Adderley live albums
Albums produced by David Axelrod (musician)
Capitol Records live albums